Pheneticillin (or phenethicillin) is a penicillin. It is not approved by the FDA for use in the United States.

References
 
 

Penicillins